Dendroxena quadrimaculata is a species of beetle belonging to the family Silphidae. It is native to Eurasia and Africa.

References

Silphidae